Scoparia pyralella, the meadow grey, is a species of moth of the family Crambidae. It was first described by Michael Denis and Ignaz Schiffermüller in 1775.

Distribution
This species can be found in most of Europe. It is quite common over most of Britain. It inhabits fields and forests.

Description

Scoparia pyralella has a wingspan of 17–20 mm. These small moths have pale brown or whitish forewings with darker brown markings and transversal white lines. Hindwings are whitish Meyrick describes it -The forewings are white, more or less sprinkled with dark fuscous; a black ochreous- mixed mark from base of costa ; lines white, dark-edged, first rather irregular, second
slightly angulate-sinuate above middle ; round orbicular, and narrow oval claviform yellow - ochreous, edged with dark fnscous, resting on first line; discal spot large, 8 -shaped,
yellow -ochreous, dark -margined, touching costa above, and second line beneath ; terminal area dark fuscous, subterminal line white, irregular. Hindwings are ochreous-whitish, terminally suffused with grey.

This species is rather similar to Scoparia ambigualis, Scoparia ancipitella, Scoparia basistrigalis, Scoparia subfusca, Eudonia lineola and Eudonia murana.

Biology
The moths fly from June to July, depending on the location. They are active mainly at dusk and night. The larvae feed on decaying leaves of various low-growing plants and perhaps on the roots of Senecio jacobaea.

Bibliography
Corley, M. F. V., Marabuto, E., & Pires, P. – 2007 - New Lepidoptera for the fauna of Portugal (Insecta: Lepidoptera). - SHILAP Revista de Lepidopterologia 35(139), 321-334.
Heckford, R. J. (2011): A note on the larva of Scoparia pyralella ([Denis & Schiffermüller], 1775) (Lepidoptera: Pyralidae). Entomologist's Gazette 62: 1-6
Ivinskis, P. – 1993 - Check-list of Lithuanian Lepidoptera - Vilnius, 210 pp.
Martin, M.O. 1986 - Family Pyralidae - Pyralid moths -in: G. S. Medvedev (ed.), Keys to the Insects of the European Part of the USSR 4 (3): 232-244.

References

External links
Lepidoptera of Belgium
Lepiforum.de

Scorparia
Moths of Europe
Moths described in 1775
Taxa named by Michael Denis
Taxa named by Ignaz Schiffermüller